Nando Wormgoor (born 17 February 1992) is a Dutch professional footballer who currently plays as a centre back.

Personal life
His older brother Vito Wormgoor is also a footballer.

External links
 Voetbal International profile 
 

1992 births
Living people
Dutch footballers
FC Dordrecht players
RKC Waalwijk players
VV DOVO players
Kozakken Boys players
Eredivisie players
Eerste Divisie players
People from Leersum
Association football defenders
Footballers from Utrecht (province)